Vysotskiy Peak is a peak, 2,035 m, in the north part of Gorki Ridge, overlooking Schussel Moraine in the Humboldt Mountains, Queen Maud Land. Discovered and plotted from air photos by German Antarctic Expedition, 1938–39. Mapped from air photos and surveys by Norwegian Antarctic Expedition, 1956–60; remapped by Soviet Antarctic Expedition, 1960–61, and named after Soviet geographer G.N. Vysotskiy.

Mountains of Queen Maud Land
Humboldt Mountains (Antarctica)